Kommune may mean:

 The term for municipality in Germany, Norway or Denmark (and, similarly, a kommun in Sweden and kommuna in the Faroe Islands)
 An intentional community
 Kommune 1

See also